The Welsh Rugby Union Division Five West (also called the SWALEC Division Five West for sponsorship reasons) is a rugby union league in Wales first implemented for the 1995/96 season.

Competition format and sponsorship

Competition
There are 11 clubs in the WRU Division Five West. During the course of a season (which lasts from September to May) each club plays the others twice, once at their home ground and once at that of their opponents for a total of 20 games for each club, with a total of 110 games in each season. Teams receive four points for a win and two point for a draw, an additional bonus point is awarded to either team if they score four tries or more in a single match. No points are awarded for a loss though the losing team can gain a bonus point for finishing the match within seven points of the winning team. Teams are ranked by total points, then the number of tries scored and then points difference. At the end of each season, the club with the most points is crowned as champion. If points are equal the tries scored then points difference determines the winner. The team who is declared champion at the end of the season is eligible for promotion to the WRU Division Four South West.

Sponsorship 
In 2008 the Welsh Rugby Union announced a new sponsorship deal for the club rugby leagues with SWALEC valued at £1 million (GBP). The initial three year sponsorship was extended at the end of the 2010/11 season, making SWALEC the league sponsors until 2015. The leagues sponsored are the WRU Divisions one through to seven.

 (2002-2005) Lloyds TSB
 (2005-2008) Asda
 (2008-2015) SWALEC

2010/2011 season

League teams
 Burry Port RFC
 Bynea RFC
 Fishguard and Goodwick RFC
 Furance United RFC
 Llandybie RFC
 Llangwm RFC
 Pembroke RFC
 Penygroes RFC
 Pontyates RFC
 St. Clears RFC
 St. Davids RFC
 Swansea Uplands RFC

2009/2010 season

League teams
 Aberaeron RFC
 Bynea RFC
 Fishguard and Goodwick RFC
 Furance United RFC
 Llangwm RFC
 New Dock Stars RFC
 Neyland RFC
 Penygroes RFC
 Pontyates RFC
 St. Clears RFC
 St. Davids RFC
 Swansea Uplands RFC

League table

2008/2009 season

League teams
 Aberaeron RFC
 Swansea Uplands RFC
 Cefneithin RFC
 Fishguard and Goodwick RFC
 Furnace United RFC
 Llangwm RFC
 Milford RFC
 Neyland RFC
 Pontyates RFC
 St. Clears RFC
 St. Davids RFC

League table

2007/2008 season

League teams 
 Aberaeron RFC
 Burry Port RFC
 Cefneithin RFC
 Fishguard and Goodwick RFC
 Furnace United RFC
 Llandybie RFC
 Llangwm RFC
 Penygroes RFC
 Pontyates RFC
 St. Clears RFC
 St. Davids RFC

League table

References

7